Józef Razowski (born 4 April 1932) is a Polish entomologist and lepidopterist specializing in Tortricidae. He is an honorary member of the Polish Entomological Society and a working member of the Polish Academy of Arts and Sciences (PAU). From 1988 to 1997, Razowski headed the Institute of Systematics and Evolution of Animals.

Biography 
Józef Razowski was born in Milówka, a village in the southern part of Poland. After finishing engineering studies at the Tadeusz Kościuszko University of Technology in 1953, he started working at the Faculty of the Systematic Zoology of the Polish Academy of Sciences (PAN) a year later, of which he was director from 1988 to 1997.  In the meantime, he pursued further studies at Jagiellonian University, getting his master's degree in 1958 and a PhD in 1961. Razowski then received habilitation in 1966 and was given the title of professor in 1973. In 1975, he founded the Lepidopterology Section of the Polish Entomological Society, which he directed for five years. Razowski retired in 2003.

Razowski specialises on anatomy, morphology, systematics, and ecology of moths and butterflies of the Palearctic and Neotropical realms, with a focus on tortrix moths, and is credited with the creation of new concepts of the classification of Lepidoptera. Between 1953 and 2006, he has described 1744 Lepidopteran taxa and has written about 20 books and monographs on entomology.

Selected publications
 World fauna of the Tortricini: '(Lepidoptera, Tortricidae)''', Polish Scientific Publishers, Kraków 1966, 658 p.
 The type specimens of the species of some Tortricidae (Lepidoptera), Polish Scientific Publishers, Kraków 1971
 Lepidoptera of Poland, Volume 1'',  Washington D.C. 1976

Notes

References

External links 

 Biodiversity Library
 UN Food and Agriculture Organisation
 Profile on the Nauka Polska platform
 Data page on Wikispecies

1932 births
Living people
Jagiellonian University alumni
Polish entomologists
Polish lepidopterists